Sheikh Abdul Awal is a judge of the High Court Division of the Bangladesh Supreme Court.

Early life 
Awal was born on 4 June 1960 to Sheikh Yousuff Ali and Saleha Begum. He completed a M.A., M.S.S., and law degree.

Career 
Awal became a lawyer of the District Courts on 30 October 1986.

On 26 February 1989, Awal became a lawyer of the High Court Division of Bangladesh Supreme Court.

Awal was appointed to the High Court Division as an additional judge on 23 August 2004.

On 23 August 2006, Awal became a permanent judge of the High Court Division.

On 26 August 2008, Awal and Justice Tariq ul Hakim granted bail to Tarique Rahman, son of former Prime Minister Khaleda Zia, on an extortion case. Awal and Justice AKM Fazlur Rahman on 8 October 2008, ordered the government not to harass Saifur Rahman. On 17 October 2008, Awal and Justice Tariqul Hakim granted bail to Lutfozzaman Babar, former Minister of Home Affairs, who had been sentenced to 17 years imprisonment for illegal procession of weapons by Judge Sayed Jahed Mansur.

On 8 March 2015, Awal and Justice Abu Taher Mohammad Saifur Rahman granted bail to an Islamic State recruit and son of former judge of the High Court Division, Justice Abdus Salam Mamun.

On 3 March 2010, Awal and Justice Md Iman Ali declared the death penalty under Women and Children Repression Prevention (Special) Act, 1995 illegal as it did not offer an alternate punishment besides the death penalty which was against the constitution of Bangladesh. The verdict was delivered following a petition filed by Bangladesh Legal Aid and Services Trust and Sukur Ali, a convicted murder and rapist sentenced to death under the act.

On 21 July 2018, Awal and Justice Bhishmadev Chakrabortty in a verdict found involvement of seven staff of the court system involved in forging bail order. Awal and Justice Bhishmadev Chakrabortty granted bail to Shahidul Alam.

Awal and Justice Bhishmadev Chakrabortty accepted the bail plea of two former inspector generals of police, Ashraful Huda and Shahudul Haque, on 21 January 2019 for their involvement in the August 21 grenade attack case.

References 

Living people
1960 births
20th-century Bangladeshi lawyers
Supreme Court of Bangladesh justices
21st-century Bangladeshi judges